WCCX (104.5 FM) was a student-run college radio station licensed to Waukesha, Wisconsin, and served the Carroll University campus and area immediately surrounding it. It was owned by Carroll University. WCCX was also known as "The X" and "The voice of Carroll University," and played an eclectic mix typical of college radio, including music from both major label and independent artists. WCCX is also the only media outlet covering Carroll Pioneer athletic events. The original call letters for the station were WCCZ.

The Station was a completely student run organization at the college. The WCCX studios were located in the lower level of the Carroll University "Campus Center" (student union) building. The Campus Center building also housed the antenna from which WCCX transmitted its 13 watt signal, which could be heard throughout most of the city of Waukesha.  Upon leaving the city in any direction, WCCX's signal was overtaken by WSLD, a full-power commercial station broadcasting from Whitewater, 30 miles away.

WCCX discontinued operation on May 31, 2022 at 4:30 PM.

External links

CCX
CCX